Nadia Mikriukova (20 October 1972 — 17 January 2020) was a Russian mountain bike orienteer.

At the 2006 World MTB Orienteering Championships in Joensuu she won a gold medal in the relay, together with Ksenia Chernykh and Anna Ustinova.

References

1972 births
2020 deaths
Russian orienteers
Female orienteers
Russian female cyclists
Mountain bike orienteers
21st-century Russian women